Expresso das Ilhas (Portuguese for "The Islands' Express") is a weekly Cape Verdean newspaper that covers its top stories in the archipelago and local stories from each island. The newspaper is located in the Cape Verdean capital city of Praia and has one of the largest circulations in Cape Verde. The newspaper is published in Portuguese, apart from some occasional articles in Cape Verdean Creole. Its current editor-in-chief is João Augusto do Rosário.'
Its daily circulation are around 10,000, it costs 100 per copy as of 2010.  The newspaper is also available on the Internet.

Description
The newspaper is close to the Movement for Democracy (MPD) political party.

The logo of the newspaper features a navy and light blue wave on the left.

The paper is also in circulation outside the country, its daily circulation of the paper is 4,000 in Portugal and 1,000 in Angola.

Sections
Expresso das Ilhas features sports, weather, businesses, entertainment and sports.

History
Together with A Semana,  Expresso das Ilhas was founded in 1991. The newspaper celebrated its 10th anniversary in 2001 and recently its 25th anniversary in 2016.

Editors
Chissana Magalhães
Dulcina Mendes

See also
Newspapers in Cape Verde

Notes

External links
Expresso das Ilhas Homepage

Mass media in Praia
Newspapers published in Cape Verde
Portuguese-language newspapers
Creole-language mass media
1991 establishments in Cape Verde